Cliffside, also known as H. E. Lawrence Estate, is a historic home located at Palisades, Rockland County, New York.  It was designed by J. Cleveland Cady and was built in 1876.  The estate house is a two-story, "L"-shaped, Flemish Colonial Revival style stone dwelling.  It features a steep cross-gambrel roof and a one-story wraparound verandah.  Also on the property is a contributing carriage house.

It was listed on the National Register of Historic Places in 1990.

References

Houses on the National Register of Historic Places in New York (state)
Colonial Revival architecture in New York (state)
Houses completed in 1876
Houses in Rockland County, New York
National Register of Historic Places in Rockland County, New York